Abū Naṣr Tāj al-Dīn ʻAbd al-Wahhāb ibn ʿAlī ibn ʻAbd al-Kāfī al-Subkī, or Tāj al-Dīn al-Subkī or simply Ibn al-Subki (1327-1370) was a leading Islamic scholar, a faqīh, a muḥaddith and a historian from the celebrated al-Subkī family of Shāfiʿī ʿulamā, during the Mamluk era.

Life 
Tāj al-Dīn al-Subkī was born and educated in Cairo, Egypt, in 1327 (727 AH). He was first educated by his father, the celebrated scholar Taqī al-Dīn al-Subkī, an influential figure in the umma. At age 11 years he joined his father in Damascus, where he studied under the leading scholars of his day, such as the historian al-Dhahabi and the jurist Ibn al-Naqīb. Aged 18 he became a mudarris (professor) and khaṭīb at the Umayyad Mosque.  In his late twenties he began to assist his father as qāḍī (Chief judge) of Syria, and on his father's retirement to Cairo in 1354, he replaced him as qāḍī of Damascus. He also held the title Mufti  In 1357 he was removed from office but reinstated several months later. In 1368 he was jailed for misappropriation of funds.  Following a petition by friends, he was released after 80 days and seems to have been exonerated.  He died of the plague in 1370 (771 AH) aged 44 years.

Works 
Ṭabaqāt al-Šāfiʻiyyaẗ—  Kubrā, Wusṭā wa Ṣughrā (Large, Medium and Concise); Biographical dictionary of the scholars of the Shāfi’ī legal school; based on the Tabyīn kadhib al-Muftarī fī mā nusiba ilā al-Imām Abī al-Ḥasan al- Ash’arī of Ibn ’Asākir; (Cairo: Maṭbaʻaẗ al-Ḥusayniyyaẗ al-Miṣriyyaẗ, 1906)
Kitāb Mu'īd an-Ni'am wa-Mubīd an-Niqām ("The restorer of favours and the restrainer of chastisements"); Arabic text with introduction and notes by David Vilhelm Myhrman: treats 113 trades, professions and offices of the author's own time, in the light of how their exponents should behave in order to recover God's favour. (English translation: Luzac & Co., London, 1908).
Kitāb al-Ashbāh wa-l-Naẓāʾir, a legal digest. Tāj al-Dīn al-Subkī, al-Ashbāh wa-l-Naẓāʾir, ed. by Aḥmad ʿAbd al-Mawjūd and ʿAlī Muḥammad ʿIwaḍ, 2 vols. (Beirut: Dār al-Kutub al-ʿIlmīya, 1991)

See also 
 List of Ash'aris and Maturidis
 List of Muslim theologians
 List of Sufis

References

Bibliography

Shafi'is
Asharis
Sunni Sufis
14th-century Muslim theologians
Sharia judges
Shaykh al-Islāms
Sunni Muslim scholars of Islam
Sunni imams
Egyptian imams
Egyptian Sufis
Egyptian encyclopedists
Theologians from the Mamluk Sultanate
14th-century Arabs
14th-century Egyptian historians
14th-century Muslim scholars of Islam
1327 births
1370 deaths
Supporters of Ibn Arabi